Leonard Alfred Walter Kent (26 December 1924 – 17 December 2014) was a New Zealand cricketer. He played 32 first-class matches for Auckland between 1943 and 1952.

Playing for Auckland against Wellington in 1944-45 he made six stumpings, all off the leg-spin bowling of Ces Burke, and also took two catches, one off Burke. He was considered one of New Zealand's best young wicketkeepers in 1948, but never achieved national selection.

See also
 List of Auckland representative cricketers

References

External links
 

1924 births
2014 deaths
New Zealand cricketers
Auckland cricketers
Cricketers from Auckland
North Island cricketers